Barthélemy Prieur (c. 1536-1611) was a French sculptor.

Prieur was born to a Huguenot family in Berzieux, Champagne (now in the department of the Marne). He traveled to Italy, where he worked from 1564 to 1568 for Emmanuel Philibert, Duke of Savoy in Turin. Upon his return to France, he worked principally on funerary monuments and busts, but also on small bronzes.

In 1571 he began employment under Jean Bullant at  the Palais du Louvre, where he was a contemporary of Germain Pilon. In 1585 he created the monument to Christophe de Thou, now preserved in the Louvre Museum, and was named sculptor to king Henry IV in 1591. He restored the Roman marble now called the Diana of Versailles in 1602.

Several of his bronzes are preserved in the National Gallery of Art, Washington, DC, including Gladiator, Lion Devouring a Doe, Seated Woman Pulling a Thorn from Her Heel, and Small Horse. His bronze busts of King Henry IV and his wife Marie de' Medici (circa 1600) are now in the Ashmolean Museum. His Monument du coeur du connétable Anne de Montmorency is on display in the Louvre.

References 
 Regina Seelig-Teuwen, "Barthélemy Prieur, contemporain de Germain Pilon", Actes du Colloque : Germain Pilon et les sculpteurs français de la Renaissance, Musée du Louvre, 26-27 Octobre 1990, La Documentation française, Paris, 1993.

External links
Detailed biography of Barthélemy Prieur in the Virtual Museum of Protestantism
 

1530s births
1611 deaths
16th-century French sculptors
French male sculptors
17th-century French sculptors
French Protestants
Huguenots